Andreas Spering (born in 1966) is a German conductor and harpsichordist, who specializes in Early music. He is the younger brother of the conductor Christoph Spering.

Recordings 
 Kantaten für Esterhazy by Joseph Haydn
 Siroe, by Georg Friedrich Händel.
 Imeneo by Georg Friedrich Händel.
 Gera: die Feuerbrunst by Joseph Haydn
 Erwin und Elmire by Johann Friedrich Reichardt.
 Serenades op. 11 and op. 16 by Johannes Brahms
 The Creation by Joseph Haydn.
 Il ritorno di Tobia by Joseph Haydn.
 Applausus by Joseph Haydn.

References

External links 
 
 Recordings on JPC
 

1966 births
Living people
Musicians from Cologne
German conductors (music)
German harpsichordists